Chak Chaudharian  is a village in Tensile Dunyapur, District Lodhran, Punjab, Pakistan on National Highway E5 (Khanewal Road).

Population 
Population is about 6,000 people who are resident in about 450 houses.

Education 
There is high school for girls, a primary school for boys and a private school.

Villages in Lodhran District